This article is part of the history of rail transport by country series

The history of rail transport in Luxembourg began in 1846 and continues to the present day.

Origins

The first negotiations for the creation of a railway on the territory of the Grand Duchy of Luxembourg began in 1845. A preliminary agreement was signed with a British company on 4 June 1846, but did not immediately bear fruit. A few years later, by the law of 7 January 1850, the government was authorized to negotiate with private companies. The law provided a guarantee of a minimum interest of 3%.

In 1853, the Luxembourger François-Émile Majerus, who had worked for a long time in Mexico as an engineer and geologist, published a pamphlet showing the great economic advantages for agriculture, trade and the Luxembourgish steel industry which would result from a Luxembourgish railway network connected to neighbouring countries.

On 25 November 1855, after five years of negotiations the Chamber passed a law mandating a Luxembourgish railway network, which was to be connected with railway lines abroad.

Four main lines were built:
 Luxembourg – Bettembourg – France (11 August 1859)
 Luxembourg – Kleinbettingen – Belgium (15 September 1859)
 Luxembourg – Wasserbillig – Germany (29 August 1861)
 Luxembourg – Ettelbrück (21 July 1862), Ettelbrück – Kautenbach (15 December 1866), Ettelbrück – Diekirch (16 November 1862), Kautenbach – Troisvierges – Belgium (20 February 1867)
Two smaller lines were built to transport the iron ore to the blast furnaces at Dommeldange:
 Bettembourg – Esch-Alzette (came into service 23 April 1859)
 Noertzange – Rumelange – Ottange (1 June 1860)
Due to the opposition of the local population, the lines were not laid through villages and vineyards.

The railway line received the name of the Dutch King and Grand Duke of Luxembourg: "Guillaume Luxembourg" (GL). It was administered until 10 May 1871 by the Compagnie Francaise de l'Est. After this, the Prussians, having just won the Franco-Prussian War and subsequently having annexed the Alsace, transferred the French rights into a new Compagnie EL (Reichseisenbahn Elsass-Lothringen).

The law of 7 May 1856 mandated the construction of a new direct railway line to Saarbrücken, without going via Trier. This project, the law notwithstanding, was never executed.

Luxembourg City 
On 30 October 1858, the founding stone of the first railway station in Luxembourg City was laid down. The Fortress of Luxembourg was at this point still garrisoned by the Prussian military, and for strategic reasons the railway line could not go into the fortress. Therefore, the new station was built on the Bourbon Plateau outside of the Fortress. The Prussian military authorities demanded that it be built out of wood. The fact that the station was built outside the fortress, 1,500 metres away from the city centre, on the other side of the Pétrusse valley, is the reason for the construction of the city's viaduct, the Passerelle and the Adolphe Bridge.

On 4 October 1859, at the celebrations for the first train to depart from Luxembourg, the patriotic song "Feierwon" was sung for the first time on the steps of the town hall. This became the unofficial national anthem.

As part of the celebrations on 4/5 October, the first stone of the Passerelle bridge was laid down.

The first train from the city to Hesperange forest, Prince Henry was a passenger, was pulled by a horse. The track construction from Hesperange to the city had not progressed enough to accommodate a steam locomotive.

Prince-Henri network 

From 1864 several prominent figures put their support behind the idea of constructing a second railway line (Gürtelbahn). These included Eugène Guyot, a Brussels book printer; Simon Philippart, a Brussels banker; and François Majerus, Luxembourgish engineer. It was to go from Wasserbillig, along the Sauer, via Ettelbrück, along the Attert and the Belgian border, via Kleinbettingen to Pétange, where the centre of the new network was to be located. From Pétange it was to go on to Esch-Alzette.

On 19 March 1869, to realise this project, a law created the Compagnie des chemins de fer Prince-Henri. Prince Henry was at the time the Lieutenant-Governor of Luxembourg.

In the spring of 1870, work started in two places: the line Esch-Alzette – Pétange – Steinfort and the line Pétange – Fond-de-Gras. At the same time the line Clemency – Autelbas – Arlon was started.

From 1 August 1873, the first trains ran on the new PH network:
 Esch-Alzette – Pétange (16,02 km)
 Pétange – Steinfort (18,36 km)
 Hagen – Kleinbettingen (1,11 km).
1873 – 1874: From Diekirch, along the Sauer, a new project was started, the Ettelbrück-Wasserbillig line. 50 km in length, in order to avoid tunnels it went all the way through the Sauer valley up to Wasserbillig. On 20 October 1873 the Diekirch – Echternach line was inaugurated in the presence of Prince Henry, in Echternach. It was only fully functional from 8 December 1873, as there was still some work to be done. On 20 May 1874 the Echternach-Wasserbillig line started work.

In 1874, the double track Pétange – Athus line was built, to create another connection to Belgium.

During 1874 – 1877, the customers of the ironworks were losing interest in Luxembourgish cast iron. Due to its high phosphorus contents, it was too brittle. Its price fell from 140 to 45 francs per tonne. The first crisis was unavoidable, and 40% of the ironworkers lost their jobs. The Prince-Henri company went bankrupt.

In 1877, the government stepped in and in 1878 formed a new company, along with private investors, the “Société Luxembourgeoise des Minières et Chemins de Fer Prince Henri”. Its abbreviation remained “PH”.

Sidney Gilchrist Thomas and his cousin Percy Gilchrist invented a new procedure to produce steel from the phosphorus cast iron. This created a boom for Luxembourgish steel-working, and new steelworks and rolling mills sprung up.

The new PH company made efforts to finish construction of their lines. On the Steinfort - Ettelbrück section, the longest tunnel of Luxembourg (700 m) was dug and the line was in use from 20 April 1880.
 1880: The first express train Luxembourg – Paris was scheduled and went via Esch-Alzette – Pétange – Athus.
 1 June 1881: The Kautenbach – Wiltz, line, built by PH, started service.
 30 December 1883: PH opened a Red Lands railway station with two platforms, near Esch-Alzette. The company Cockerill supplied two locomotives to park the carriages.
 26 April 1886: The following concessions for narrow-gauge lines were awarded:
 Noerdange - Martelange
 Diekirch - Vianden
 27 June 1886: The connection with France via Rodange – Mont-Saint-Martin – Longwy was realised.
 1 July 1888: After the Kautenbach – Wilz line (PH) was extended to the Belgian border, where it was connected to the Belgian network, there was now a connection to Bastogne. A disadvantage was that this line was only accessible via the GL network (Ettelbrück – Kautenbach – Troisvierges line). All reserve materials needed in Wiltz, had to be brought in from Pétange.
 5 November 1891: The Echternach – Wasserbillig line was extended to Grevenmacher. PH built a station in Wasserbillig with a dining room, waiting rooms and staff accommodation. Since 1987 the building was used as offices by the commune of Mertert.
 1895 - 1900: PH made huge profits. In this period, various elaborate buildings were constructed in Pétange: a large rail station, a headquarters, a block of social housing for workers, five villas as accommodation for the director and the engineers. The street where these villas stood (and one still stands) is still named Härewee ("Gentlemen Street"). Other stations on this route were also enlarged.
On 8 August 1900, the new Pétange – Dippach – Luxembourg line opened. This was the point of PH's greatest expansion.

During 1901 – 1907, air brake, invented by Westinghouse, was introduced in Luxembourg, as with other European railways. The “brakers” could be done away with.

On 4 November 1904, an industrial narrow-gauge line (1.000 mm) started operating from Grundhof to the stone quarries on the hill over Dillingen. In November 1911 it was extended to Beaufort and made accessible to passengers.

At Pétange, a "Machine fixe" was built. Wells were dug, the minerals removed from the water, and the water pumped to a water tower by the station. This water was then used in the steam engines.

The "Prince" in 1904 had about 200 km of railway line (of which 10 km on Belgian territory), 46 steam locomotives (6 of them for narrow-gauge lines), 68 passenger carriages and 24 baggage vans.

In May 1919, PH was made by the state to exploit the vicinal train lines: the Luxembourg – Echternach (Chareli) line and the Bettembourg – Aspelt line.

On 29 May 1927, the railway received competition. The Minette tram of the "Syndicat des Tramways Intercommunaux du Canton d'Esch" (TICE), founded in 1914 by the communes of Esch-Alzette, started service.

From 1929 onwards, profits slowly decreased until 1940.

World War II and aftermath 
On 10 May 1940, German troops invaded Luxembourg and confiscated the rail lines for use by the occupying army. In November 1941, Luxembourg was officially annexed by Nazi Germany. The Reichsbahn took over the running of the railways; some employees were subject to dismissal, moved to Germany or imprisoned.

After the liberation of the capital on 10 September 1944, Luxembourgish railways worked to open temporary service. The first trains to run were military transports. The first worker trains resumed service on 5 October 1944, bringing workers via the Attert line to Differdange, to the only steelworks that was still operating, where “Grey-beams” were being rolled, which were urgently needed by the US and for reconstruction.

On 17 April 1946, the Société Nationale des Chemins de Fer Luxembourgeois (CFL) was founded. The concessions of WL and PH were withdrawn by the law of 16 June 1947. The CFL existed on paper, but the Chamber of Deputies did not ratify the law until 4 June 1947. All Luxembourgish railway lines were given to the CFL for a term of 99 years. The Luxembourgish government owned 51%, and France and Belgium 24,5% each.

On 28 September 1956, the era of the electric railway started, with the electrification of the transit route Kleinbettingen-border – Bettembourg-border via Luxembourg City.

See also

Rail transport in Luxembourg
Trams in Luxembourg

References

Notes

Books
 Publications de la société pour la recherche et la conservation des monuments historiques dans le Grand-Duché de Luxembourg, XXII, année 1866, imprimerie-librairie V. Buck, Luxembourg, 1867. pp. 127–133 (full text)

External links
 rail.lu - Information about the railways in and around Luxembourg 
 

Luxembourg
Rail transport
Rail transport in Luxembourg